Elections to Lewisham London Borough Council were held on 7 May 1998. The whole council was up for election for the first time since the 1994 election.

Lewisham local elections are held every four years, with the next due in 2002.

Election result

|}

Ward results

References

1998
1998 London Borough council elections